The Democratic European Force (Force européenne démocrate, FED) is a  centre-right political party in France founded in July 2012 by Jean-Christophe Lagarde and other dissidents of the New Centre who opposed Hervé Morin's leadership. It is a member of the Union of Democrats and Independents.

Elected officials
 Deputies: Jean-Christophe Lagarde, François Rochebloine, André Santini and François Sauvadet
Senators: Vincent Capo-Canellas, Hervé Marseille, Michel Mercier and Yves Pozzo di Borgo
Presidents of General Councils: François Sauvadet (Côte-d'Or), Danielle Chuzeville (Rhône)

References

External links
Official website

Political parties of the French Fifth Republic
Political parties established in 2012
Centrist parties in France
Liberal parties in France
Christian democratic parties in Europe
Pro-European political parties in France
2012 establishments in France